Gabrielė Andrašiūnienė (born 29 July 1992 in Vilnius, Lithuania) is a Lithuanian mountain bike orienteer, European champion in long-distance event in 2022.

Biography 
Andrašiūnienė finished second in middle-distance racing at the 2022 European MTB Orienteering Championships. She won a gold medal at the 2022 European MTB Orienteering Championships.

References

External links 
 orienteering.org profile

Lithuanian orienteers
Female orienteers
Lithuanian female cyclists
Mountain bike orienteers
Living people
Sportspeople from Vilnius
1992 births